Jafar Jen (also Romanized as Ja‘far Jen; also known as Ja‘farebn and Ja‘far Jin) is a village in Khesht Rural District, Khesht District, Kazerun County, Fars Province, Iran. At the 2006 census, its population was 528, in 140 families.

References 

Populated places in Kazerun County